Signos (Spanish for Signs) is the third studio album recorded by Argentine rock band Soda Stereo, released on 10 November 1986. It was remastered in 2007 at Sterling Sound Studios in New York. In 2007, the Argentine edition of Rolling Stone ranked it 25 on its list of "The 100 Greatest Albums of National Rock".

Track listing

 All lyrics written by Gustavo Cerati.

In popular culture

Cover versions
"Prófugos" was covered by Ruggero Pasquarelli and Valentina Zenere the pop version of the Disney Channel teen series Soy Luna.

Media
"No Existes" was featured in the 1988 film Alguien te está mirando.

Personnel
Soda Stereo
 Gustavo Cerati – Vocals, guitars, Roland 707 drum machine, percussion
 Zeta Bosio – Bass 
 Charly Alberti – Drums, percussion

Additional personnel
 Fabian Vön Quintiero – Keyboards
 Richard Coleman – Additional guitars
 Celsa Mel Gowland – Backing vocals

Brass:
 Diego Urcola – Trumpet
 Pablo Rodriguez – Alto saxophone
 Sebastian Schon – Tenor saxophone
 Marcelo Ferreyra – Trombone

 Produced by Soda Stereo

References

External links
 Official website
 Discography

Soda Stereo albums
1986 albums
Spanish-language albums
Sony Music Argentina albums